The 2003-04 Libyan Premier League was the 36th edition of Libyan top-flight football, organised by the Libyan Football Federation. History was made this season, as Olomby of Zawiya, became the first side outside of the two biggest cities in the country (Tripoli and Benghazi) to win the premier division. Their feat is yet to be beaten. They also prevented Ittihad from winning a treble of Libyan Premier League titles. This was the first time since that the Big Two had not won the league, since Mahalla achieved this in the 1998–99 season. Olomby have failed to come close to winning the league since, their best finish being 3rd in the 2004–05 season.

Teams

League table

Results

Golden Boot
 14 goals
  Ahmad Saad - Al Nasr
 13 goals
  Haitham Abu Shah - Al Akhdar
 11 goals
  Aleya Soumah Maneah - Al Olomby
 10 goals
  Mara Kaba Abdoulaye - Al Olomby
 9 goals
  Ahmed al Masly - Al Ittihad
  Abdelhameed al Zidane - Al Charara

Promotion/relegation playoff
This was played between the 3rd-placed side in the Libyan Second Division, Al Shat, and this season's 12th-placed side, Al Charara. The winner would compete in next season's Libyan Premier League, while the loser would compete in the 2004–05 Libyan Second Division.

Al Shat are therefore promoted to next season's Libyan Premier League.

Libyan Premier League seasons
1
Libyan Premier League